Cadlina luteomarginata, common name the yellow-edged cadlina, is a species of colorful sea slug, a dorid nudibranch, a shell-less marine gastropod mollusk in the family Cadlinidae.

Distribution
This dorid nudibranch lives in the eastern Pacific from Alaska to Mexico. Reports of this species from the eastern coast of North America, need to be investigated.  Currently, there is no concrete evidence that this species occurs in the Atlantic Ocean.

Description
The yellow-edged cadlina is a white, oval-shaped seaslug with  yellow projections on the dorsum and a bright yellow rim to the mantle. It shows near the rear end a ring of six yellow-tipped feathery gills and rhinophores. The antennae are comblike. The radula has strongly hooked lateral teeth. Their subepithelial glands are compound and consist of large vacuoles with bluish stained content. Agglomerations of glandular tissue can be found on the apex of the tubercles.

C. luteomarginata produces the twenty-three carbon terpenoid luteone.

Life habits
This species lives under rocks and in tidepools from the intertidal zone to a depth of about 20 m in the circalittoral zone. It  eats several species of spiculate sponges and also sponges from the order Dendroceratida. It is preyed upon by seastars, such as Solaster dawsoni.

Footnotes
 Debelius, H. & Kuiter, R.H. (2007) Nudibranchs of the world. ConchBooks, Frankfurt, 360 pp.  page(s): 212

References

 Behrens, D.W., Pacific Coast Nudibranchs: a guide to the opisthobranchs of the northeastern Pacific, Sea Challenger Books, Washington
 Johnson R.F. (2011) Breaking family ties: taxon sampling and molecular phylogeny of chromodorid nudibranchs (Mollusca, Gastropoda). Zoologica Scripta 40(2): 137-157. page(s): 139

External links
 Sea Slug Forum species fact sheet

Cadlinidae
Gastropods described in 1966